Kristopher Joseph Pierre Irwin Letang (born April 24, 1987) is a Canadian professional ice hockey defenceman and alternate captain for the Pittsburgh Penguins of the National Hockey League (NHL). He played juniors in the Quebec Major Junior Hockey League (QMJHL) for three seasons, during which time he was selected 62nd overall by the Penguins in the 2005 NHL Entry Draft. In his second full NHL season, Letang won the Stanley Cup with Pittsburgh, in 2009, he became a two-time Stanley Cup champion when the Penguins defeated the San Jose Sharks in 2016, and a three-time Stanley Cup champion when the Penguins defeated the Nashville Predators in 2017. Internationally, he has competed for Canada at the under-18 and under-20 levels, winning back-to-back gold medals at the World Junior Championships in 2006 and 2007.

Playing career
Letang played major junior hockey for the Val-d'Or Foreurs of the Quebec Major Junior Hockey League for three seasons. After recording 32 points in his junior rookie season, he was named to the QMJHL and the CHL All-Rookie Team. That summer, he was drafted in the third round, 62nd overall, in the 2005 NHL Entry Draft by the Pittsburgh Penguins. The next season, a 68-point effort in just 60 games earned him QMJHL First Team All-Star honours.

Making the Penguins out of training camp, Letang made his NHL debut in the 2006–07 season. He scored his first NHL goal in his third game, against Henrik Lundqvist of the New York Rangers in a 6–5 win. However, after two goals in seven games, Letang was scratched twice and then returned to Val-d'Or for further development. Playing in his third season with Val-d'Or, he led the Foreurs to the 2007 QMJHL Finals with 31 points in the post-season, only to be swept by the Lewiston MAINEiacs in four games. Upon the Foreurs' elimination, he was assigned to the Pittsburgh Penguins' American Hockey League (AHL) affiliate, the Wilkes-Barre/Scranton Penguins, who were in the second round of the Calder Cup playoffs, and recorded an assist in his only game. At season's end, he was the recipient of three major QMJHL awards. In addition to receiving the Emile Bouchard Trophy as the QMJHL's best defenceman and the Paul Dumont Trophy as the best personality, Letang also received the Kevin Lowe Trophy, as the best defensive defenceman, indicative of Letang's abilities on both ends of the ice.

Pittsburgh Penguins

After beginning the 2007–08 season in Wilkes-Barre/Scranton, Letang was quickly recalled by Pittsburgh after recording seven points in ten games in the AHL. Letang excelled in his rookie season with Pittsburgh and was invited to the 2008 NHL YoungStars Game during All-Star weekend, alongside teammate Tyler Kennedy. He completed the season with 17 points in 63 games, sixth among rookie defencemen. Making his Stanley Cup playoffs debut, Letang helped the Penguins to the 2008 Stanley Cup Finals, where they were defeated in six games by the Detroit Red Wings.

Entering the 2008–09 season, the Penguins' top two defencemen, Sergei Gonchar and Ryan Whitney, were both put on the long-term injured reserve, immediately increasing Letang's responsibilities on the team's blueline. He was placed on the Penguins top defensive pairing with Brooks Orpik, replacing Gonchar. The increased playing time resulted in a 10-goal, 33-point season, leading all team defencemen. During the season, Letang was also invited to his second NHL YoungStars Game during the 2009 All-Star weekend in his hometown of Montreal, playing for the Sophomores team.

After the Penguins eliminated the Philadelphia Flyers in the first round, Letang scored his first career NHL playoff goal in game three of the second round against the Washington Capitals on May 6, 2009, in overtime. Letang's playing status for the game had been uncertain due to a suspected shoulder injury resulting from a Mike Green hit received in Game 3. Nevertheless, his game-winning goal cut the Capitals' series lead to 2–1, helping Pittsburgh overcome the initial 2–0 series deficit and win in seven games. Advancing to the Finals, they met the Red Wings for the second consecutive year. Letang scored one goal in the series, in Game 3, helping the Penguins defeat the Red Wings in seven games. They won the Stanley Cup on June 12, 2009, winning the deciding game 2–1 at the Joe Louis Arena. Letang finished the post-season with 4 goals and 13 points over 23 games.

The following season, Letang recorded a career-low three goals to go with 24 assists. Late in the regular season, Letang signed a four-year contract extension through to the 2013–14 season on March 30, 2010, worth an annual salary of $3.5 million. Entering the 2010 Stanley Cup playoffs as defending champions, the Penguins were eliminated in the second round by the Montreal Canadiens. Letang surpassed his regular season goals total with 5 tallies in 13 post-season games, along with two assists for seven points.

With the departure of the Penguins' top defenceman, Sergei Gonchar, the following summer, Letang assumed a larger role with the club in 2010–11. Enjoying a career year, he was voted in as a starter for the 2011 NHL All-Star Game in Raleigh, North Carolina. With a career-high 50 points (eight goals and 42 assists), Letang finished the season as the second-highest scorer for the Penguins, behind Sidney Crosby. His efforts helped the Penguins to the fourth-best record in the NHL with 49 wins and 106 points despite long-term injuries to the team's top three centres – Crosby, Evgeni Malkin and Jordan Staal. Matching up against the Tampa Bay Lightning in the first round, Pittsburgh lost the series in seven games; Letang had four assists.

On January 23, 2012, Letang made the NHL 2012 All-Star roster as an injury replacement for Dustin Byfuglien, joining teammates Evgeni Malkin and James Neal. In their first round loss to the Stanley Cup playoffs against the Philadelphia Flyers, Letang scored one goal and had two assists  while earning a game misconduct in Game 3 for fighting Kimmo Timonen.

On July 2, 2013, Letang signed an eight-year contract with Pittsburgh valued at $58 million that went into effect in the 2014–15 season. Letang played in 34 games in the 2013–14 season before it was announced he would miss six weeks after suffering a stroke. On March 16, 2014, Dan Bylsma, then-head coach of the Penguins, announced Letang was cleared by doctors to return to full practice.

In the 2015–16 season, Letang was named to play for the Metropolitan Division team in the 2016 NHL All-Star Game. He scored the Cup-winning goal in game six of the 2016 Stanley Cup Finals, against Martin Jones of the San Jose Sharks. He became just the fourth player in NHL history to record a point on all four game-winning goals in the Stanley Cup Finals. He finished fourth in voting for the James Norris Memorial Trophy as the NHL's top defenceman, and was named to the end of season second all-star team.

In the 2016–17 season, Letang required neck surgery due to a herniated disk in his neck and did not play in the playoffs. Despite this, his name was added to the Stanley Cup and he received a day with the Cup as well.

On October 6, 2018, in a 5–1 loss to the Montreal Canadiens, Letang recorded his 441st assist, setting a new Penguins franchise record for most points by a defenceman. On February 11, 2019, in a 4–1 win over the Philadelphia Flyers, Letang passed Paul Coffey for most goals by a Penguins defenceman.

On July 7, 2022, in his final year of his eight-year deal before becoming an unrestricted free agent, Letang signed a six-year $36.6 million extension to stay with the Penguins.

On November 30, 2022, the Penguins announced that he would be out indefinitely after suffering a stroke two days before, the second of his career. His condition was not believed to be career-threatening. On December 10, he returned to the lineup, skating 22:14 in a 3–1 victory against the Buffalo Sabres.

International play

Letang debuted internationally for Canada in his junior rookie season during the 2005 World U18 Championships in the Czech Republic. Letang scored four points in six games in a silver medal effort, losing to the United States in the final.

The next two years, Letang competed in the World Junior Championships, earning gold in 2006 and 2007, as part of a five-year Canadian championship run. He won the first gold medal with Canada in Vancouver as the host country, then returned the next year in Sweden to score six points in six games as team captain. Letang was named to the tournament All-Star team, along with national teammates Carey Price and Jonathan Toews.

Personal life
Letang lost one of his closest friends, Luc Bourdon, who was a defensive prospect for the Vancouver Canucks, when he died in a motorcycle accident on May 29, 2008. Letang was at the time playing in the 2008 Stanley Cup Finals against the Detroit Red Wings. He and Bourdon had been teammates in junior with the Val-d'Or Foreurs and the Canadian junior team. He had been planning on buying a motorcycle but decided against it following the death of Bourdon.

Letang and his then long-term girlfriend, Catherine Laflamme, had a son born in November 2012. The couple wed on July 18, 2015, in Montreal. On December 20, 2017, the couple announced on Instagram they were expecting a second child. Their daughter was born in July 2018. His wife was a cast member on the third season of the Canadian reality series Hockey Wives.

Career statistics

Regular season and playoffs

International

Awards

NHL

Pittsburgh Penguins team awards

IIHF

Major junior

References

External links

 

1987 births
Living people
Canadian ice hockey defencemen
Ice hockey people from Montreal
National Hockey League All-Stars
Pittsburgh Penguins draft picks
Pittsburgh Penguins players
Stanley Cup champions
Val-d'Or Foreurs players
Wilkes-Barre/Scranton Penguins players